Klebark may refer to the following places in Poland:

Klebark Mały
Klebark Wielki